An Act of Senedd Cymru, or informally an Act of the Senedd, is primary legislation that can be made by the Senedd (Welsh Parliament) under part 4 of the Government of Wales Act 2006 (as amended by the Wales Act 2017). Prior to 6 May 2020 any legislation was formally known as an Act of the National Assembly for Wales or informally, an Act of the Assembly.

The power to make primary legislation was conferred on the assembly following the 2011 elections as a commencement order had been passed in the Assembly by simple majority prior to dissolution. The activation of part 4 legislative powers was as a result of a "yes" vote in the 2011 referendum held in Wales. When the power to make Acts of the Assembly commenced, the Assembly lost the ability to make Measures under part 3 of the 2006 Act. Existing Measures will remain as law unless repealed.

The current name was adopted when the Senedd and Elections (Wales) Act took effect on 6 May 2020, which renamed the "Acts of the National Assembly for Wales" stated in section 107(1) of the Government of Wales Act 2006 as officially "Acts of Senedd Cymru" (plural ) and informally referred to as “Acts of the Senedd”.

How Acts are made

Consideration by the Senedd
Bills may be introduced by Welsh Government, a committee of the Senedd, the Senedd Commission or by individual Members of the Senedd. Ballots are held to select which individual Senedd members may present bills.

Once a bill is introduced, there are four stages that need to be completed prior to the bill being submitted for royal assent. The first stage involves consideration of the general principles of the bill by a committee of the Senedd and then agreement of these principles by the Senedd in plenary session. In the second stage, the bill is considered in detail by a bill committee. The third stage involves detailed consideration of the bill and any amendments by the Senedd in plenary, this can be followed by a Report Stage where further amendments can be proposed. Finally, in the fourth stage, the Senedd votes to pass the bill in its final form.

Period of intimation and Royal Assent
When a bill completes its passage through the Senedd, it enters a four-week period of intimation, during which the Attorney General for England and Wales or the Counsel General for Wales may refer the bill to the Supreme Court of the United Kingdom if they consider that any provisions of the bill are outside the legislative competency of the Senedd. The Secretary of State for Wales may also make an order prohibiting the Clerk to the Senedd from submitting the Bill for royal assent during this time. After the period of intimation expires, the Clerk may submit the bill for royal assent. The bill becomes an Act of the Senedd when Letters Patent under the Welsh Seal are made by the Queen to signify assent.

Royal assent to Acts of Senedd Cymru was given by means of Letters Patent using the following wording:

Form of letters patent during the reign of Queen Elizabeth II:

The Letters Patent may also be made in Welsh:

Form of letters patent during the reign of King Charles III;

Enacting formula

Acts of the Assembly begin with the following words of enactment:

Subjects in which Acts can be made

Under the Wales Act 2017, the Senedd has legislative competence to pass Acts on any matter relating only to Wales that is not a reserved matter, or which affects powers exercisable other than in relation to Wales. The list of reserved matters is extensive; it includes:
the Crown, the union with England, and the UK Parliament;
the Civil Service;
regulation, registration and finances of political parties;
whether Senedd elections may be held on the same day as certain other elections and referendums;
the Electoral Commission and certain other matters related the regulation of Senedd and local government elections and campaigning;
the legal system and international law, including legal aid, arbitration, coroners, prisons, offender management, rehabilitation of offenders, and criminal records;
family law, except parental discipline (Wales banned smacking in 2020, whereas it is still legal in England);
crime, public order, and policing and police and crime commissioners;
foreign affairs including nationality, immigration and travel documents, extradition, and international trade;
defence, national security, terrorism, and official secrets;
fiscal, economic and monetary policy, except for devolved and local taxes;
financial services and markets;
communications (including Internet services) and communications data, encryption, surveillance, data protection, and freedom of information;
modern slavery and prostitution;
emergency powers;
firearms, poisons, knives, drug abuse, and drug dealing;
film and video (including video game) classification;
licensing of entertainment venues and provision of alcohol;
gambling;
hunting with dogs;
animal testing;
charities and philanthropy;
insolvency;
competition;
intellectual property;
consumer protection;
postal services, except financial assistance for post offices;
most aspects of road, rail, air and sea transport and transport security;
social security, child support and child maintenance payments, pensions and public sector and armed forces compensation in cases of death etc., job search and job support;
employment rights and industrial relations;
regulation of the professions, except for social work and social care;
abortion;
xenotransplantation;
embryology, surrogacy and genetics;
medicines, including veterinary medicines;
health and safety;
gender recognition.
Additionally, unlike Acts of the UK Parliament, an Act of the Senedd is "not law" if it is inconsistent with the European Convention on Human Rights.

See also
List of Acts and Measures of the National Assembly for Wales
Measure of the National Assembly for Wales

References

External links
Law Wales Website - Home
Welsh legislation on legislation.co.uk

 
Government of Wales
Welsh laws
Statutory law